Pinochet is a surname. It is also the name of a family in Chile. Notable people with the surname include:

Augusto Pinochet, Chilean Dictator (1973–1990)
Isabel Le Brun de Pinochet, Chilean educationist
Lucia Pinochet, Chilean teacher
Tancredo Pinochet, Chilean writer and politician

Surnames of French origin